Carios erraticus, formerly called Ornithodoros erraticus, is a species of tick in the family Argasidae. The tick was described by Hippolyte Lucas in 1849.

Description
The tick is native to the Middle East and Mediterranean. It is one of the more common soft ticks to bite humans. Their main food sources in Spain are pigs; the tick has been found in pig pens in the provinces of Salamanca, Badajoz, and Huelva. The only human habitats the tick can enter are places in poor condition.

Pathology
This species carries the pathogenic Qalyub and African swine fever viruses and the spirochetes Borrelia crocidurae and Borrelia hispanica. When the tick is infected by B. crocidurae, the disease affects its genetic organ, the testes in males and the ovaries in females. The tick transmits the African swine fever virus only in Spain and Portugal.

The tick feeds at night, ingesting blood to repletion in about 15 minutes.  Small mammals are the most common hosts; this species rarely bites humans, preferring other vertebrates.  The tick has substances in its saliva, such as antihemostatic, anti-inflammatory, and immunomodulatory molecules, which help the tick get blood from the host and transfer pathogens easily. Major factors in their feeding relationship are mating, recent feeding, and size.

Some strains of entomopathogenic fungi have been found to be effective against this tick and others in the related genus Ornithodoros in a study which concluded the fungi could be used as biocontrol agents for argasid ticks; the name of this is called hyperparasitism.

References

External links

Ticks
Argasidae
Fauna of the Middle East
Animals described in 1849
Taxa named by Hippolyte Lucas